Guangzong Temple, more commonly known as the Southern Temple, is a Buddhist temple located in Bieli Town of Alxa Left Banner, Inner Mongolia, China.

History

Qing dynasty
Guangzong Temple was first built by Ahwang Duoerji, a disciple of the 6th Dalai Lama, in 1757, in the reign of Qianlong Emperor (1736–1795) the Qing dynasty (1644–1911). It initially  called "Ahda Ximai Deli Temple". The body of the 6th Dalai Lama was preserved in the temple. Three years later, Qianlong Emperor inscribed and honored the name "Guangzong Temple" in Mongolian, Chinese, Tibetan and Manchu. In the ruling of Daoguang Emperor (1821–1850), the temple was largely extended. In 1869, in the Tongzhi period (1862–1874), Guangzong Temple was completely destroyed by heartless flames of war, only the Kalachakra Hall and Vajrayogini Hall survived. Guangzong Temple was restored and redecorated in the Guangxu period (1875–1908).

People's Republic of China
In 1966, Mao Zedong launched the Cultural Revolution, the Red Guards had attacked Guangzong Temple, volumes of sutras, historical documents, and other works of art were either removed, damaged or destroyed in the ten-year movement. And the body of the 6th Dalai Lama was burned down by the Red Guards. In 1971, Guangzong Temple was dismantled and the temple fell into ruins.

After the 3rd Plenary Session of the 11th Central Committee of the Chinese Communist Party, according to the national policy of free religious belief, regular scripture lectures, meditation and other features of temple life were resumed in Yanfu Temple. In 1981, 15 halls and rooms were restored in the ruins. The ashes of the 6th Dalai Lama were enshrined in a newly established stupa.

In 1991, the Main Assembly Hall and the Bstankhang Hall were consecrated by the Living Buddha Jialasen. Ten year later, the Yellow Hall was restored, sariras of the 6th Dalai Lama were preserved in the hall.

Architecture
Guangzong Temple is situated in the west hillside of Helan Mountains and consists of over 20 halls and rooms, the existing main buildings include Main Assembly Hall, Mahavira Hall and Yellow Hall.

References

Bibliography
 

Tibetan Buddhist temples in Inner Mongolia
Gelug monasteries and temples
Buddhist temples in Alxa League
Buildings and structures in Alxa League
Tourist attractions in Alxa League
1981 establishments in China
20th-century Buddhist temples
Religious buildings and structures completed in 1981